Water system refers to a water supply network.

Water system may also refer to:
Domestic or industrial water resources
Drip irrigation, a type of micro-irrigation system 
Hydroelectricity systems 
Agricultural irrigation infrastructure
Water balance
Water distribution system 
Water resources

See also
Drainage system (disambiguation)